Nuevo Arraiján is a town in Arraiján District in the Panamá Oeste Province of Panama.

References

Populated places in Panamá Oeste Province